Taroh Matsuno (born October 17, 1934) is a Japanese meteorologist. He is a professor at the University of Tokyo.

He is the winner of the 55th IMO prize, the most prestigious award of the World Meteorological Organization.

He is the winner of the 2013 Blue Planet Prize with Daniel Sperling.

References

Japanese meteorologists
1934 births
Living people